My Mad Fat Diary is a British comedy-drama television series that aired on E4 from 14 January 2013 until 6 July 2015. It is based on My Fat, Mad Teenage Diary, written by Rae Earl.

Series overview

Episodes

Series 1 (2013)

Series 2 (2014)
The show, which drew an average of 1.2 million viewers per episode, was re-commissioned for a second series and started filming around June or July 2013. It aired on 17 February 2014. The second season aired on E4 and consisted of seven episodes. The series featured Rae starting college.

Series 3 (2015)

On 26 November 2014 Sharon Rooney confirmed on Twitter that there would be more episodes. A read through was held on 26 January 2015. The series consisted of three episodes, which began filming in February 2015 and were shown on E4 between 22 June and 6 July 2015.

References

Lists of British comedy-drama television series episodes
Lists of British teen comedy television series episodes
Lists of British teen drama television series episodes